Anarsia belutschistanella is a moth in the family Gelechiidae. It was described by Hans Georg Amsel in 1959. It is found in Iran.

References

belutschistanella
Moths described in 1959
Moths of Asia